These are the Billboard magazine Hot Dance Club Play number one hits of 1983.

See also
1983 in music
List of number-one dance hits (United States)
List of artists who reached number one on the U.S. Dance chart

References

For weeks January 1—November 5, 1983, information taken from: 
Some weeks may also be found at Billboard magazine courtesy of Google Books: 1980—1984.

1983
1983 record charts
1983 in American music